James Jene Fae Lew (born September 6, 1952) is an American actor and martial artist. He has made 80 on-screen film and television appearances and 46 more as a stunt coordinator or stunt double. He has done choreography for movies like Get Smart, Killers and the cult classic Big Trouble In Little China, as well as television shows such as National Geographic's Fight Science, The Crow: Stairway to Heaven, and Entourage. He does Shaolin Kung-Fu, Tae Kwon Do, Jeet Kune Do, Hapkido, and Boxing. He also trained Brad Pitt with sword fighting for the movie Troy.

Career
An early role for Lew was as a guard in the John Cassavetes 1976 film, The Killing of a Chinese Bookie.
Lew had a role in the Frank Harris directed action film Killpoint, which starred Leo Fong, Richard Roundtree, Cameron Mitchell and Stack Pierce. In 2017, he acted in the Mark Steven Grove directed sci-fi film Star Raiders: The Adventures of Saber Raine, which also starred Casper Van Dien, Cynthia Rothrock, Sara Salazar, and Tyler Weaver Jr.

Personal life
James is married to Jordanna Potter and his stepson is Ryan Potter, who plays Gar Logan/Beast Boy on the HBO Max series Titans.

Awards
James Lew won the Emmy for Outstanding Stunt Coordination for a Drama Series, Limited Series, or Movie in 2017.

Books
 The Art of Stretching and Kicking (2018),

Selected filmography

 1976 The Killing of a Chinese Bookie as Asian Guard (uncredited)
 1976 Enforcer from Death Row as Karate Fighter
 1977 Big Time as Karate Instructor
 1979 Young Dragon as Shao Lung
 1983 Going Berserk as Kung Fu Fighter
 1984 Killpoint as Nighthawk's Gunman #1
 1985 Ninja Turf as Chan
 1986 Big Trouble in Little China as Chang Sing #1
 1987 Steele Justice as Mob Thug #5 (uncredited)
 1988 Action Jackson as Martial Arts Instructor
 1989 Ninja Academy as Ninja Trainer
 1989 Savage Beach as Agent #1
 1989 Best of the Best as Sae Jin Kwon
 1990 Aftershock as Mr. James
 1990 China Cry as Kickboxer Instructor
 1990 Guns as Ninja #1
 1991 The Perfect Weapon as Crewcut
 1991 Night of the Warrior as Hector Sabatei
 1991 Do or Die as Lew
 1991 Showdown in Little Tokyo as Yoshida's Man (uncredited)
 1991 Double Impact as Unknown
 1992 Rapid Fire as Tau's Man At Laundry (uncredited)
 1992 Ulterior Motives as Yakuza #5
 1992 Dark Vengeance as 'Mantis'
 1992 A Mission to Kill as Viet Cong (uncredited)
 1992 Mission of Justice as Akiro
 1993 American Ninja V as 'Viper'
 1993 Hot Shots! Part Deux as Kick Boxer Opponent
 1993 Undercover Blues as Novacek's Man
 1993 Showdown as Hit Man
 1994 On Deadly Ground as Mercenary At Aegis 1 (uncredited)
 1994 Ring of Steel as Asian Fighter
 1994 The Shadow as Mongol
 1994 Red Sun Rising as Jaho
 1994 Timecop as Knife #1
 1994 Deadly Target as Guard #2 (uncredited)
 1994 Cage II as Chin
 1995 Ballistic as Woo
 1995 Midnight Man as Prince Samarki
 1995 Under Siege 2: Dark Territory as Mercenary (uncredited)
 1995 Excessive Force II: Force on Force as Lee
 1995 The Immortals as Asian Man
 1996 Night Hunter as Tom Cutter
 1996 Balance of Power (1996) as Shinji Takamura
 1996 Escape from L.A. as Saigon Shadows Gang Member (uncredited)
 1996 For Life or Death as Kaan Woo
 1996 Robo Warriors as Darius
 1996 Fox Hunt as 'Kung Fu' Lew
 1997 Buffy the Vampire Slayer as Vampire
 1997 The Girl Gets Moe as Brez
 1997 Red Corner as Unknown
 1997 High Voltage as Harry
 1998 The Replacement Killers as Bodyguard
 1998 Boogie Boy as Jason
 1998 Safe House as Asian (uncredited)
 1998 Lethal Weapon 4 as Freighter's Captain
 1998 Rush Hour as Juntao's Man In Los Angeles (uncredited)
 1999 Clubland as Lipton T's Sidekick
 2000 Deep Core as Lou Chang
 2000 Traffic as DEA Agent At CalTrans
 2001 Rush Hour 2 as Triad Gangster (uncredited)
 2002 Outside the Law as Cho Sung
 2002 The Real Deal as Black Belt
 2003 Paris as Mr. Fue
 2003 Sin as Leo Thamaree
 2004 The Perfect Party as Daddy
 2006 18 Fingers of Death! as Buford Lee
 2006 The Hitman Chronicles as Draga
 2007 Pirates of the Caribbean: At World's End as Asian Pirate (uncredited)
 2007 Rush Hour 3 as Triad Assassin (uncredited)
 2008 Superhero Movie as Shaolin Monk (uncredited)
 2008 Tropic Thunder as Flaming Dragon Member At Compound (uncredited)
 2009 Star Trek as Romulan (uncredited)
 2009 The Carbon Copy as Thug
 2009 Angel of Death as Tommy
 2009 Ballistica as Chinese Guard #1
 2009 Nephilim as Unknown
 2010 Chuck as Anad Chenerad
 2010 Taken by Force as Choy
 2010 Inception as Unknown
 2012 The Girl from the Naked Eye as Eddie
 2012 Safe as Underground Casino Guard (uncredited)
 2012 Sleeping Dogs as Sifu Kwok (voice)
 2012 Battleship as Unknown
 2013 G.I. Joe: Retaliation as China President 
 2013 Olympus Has Fallen as  Disguised Motorcade Commando
 2014 Bad Country as Doctor
 2014 Tengu, The Immortal Blade as Asura
 2015 Frankenstein as Hotel Manager
 2016 Beyond the Game as Unknown
 2016 Breakout as Captain Rusch
 2017 Star Raiders: The Adventures of Saber Raine as Sinjin
 2018 Cucuy: The Boogeyman as Beat Cop
 2019 American Bistro as Angry Man #1

References

External links

The Wing Kong Exchange Interview with James Lew

1952 births
American wushu practitioners
American male taekwondo practitioners
American Jeet Kune Do practitioners
American hapkido practitioners
American people of Chinese descent
American male film actors
American stunt performers
Living people
People from Escalon, California
Male actors from California